Nandamuri Balakrishna is an Indian actor, politician in the Telugu Desam Party founded by his father and who works predominantly in Telugu cinema. He is the sixth son of Telugu matinee idol and former Chief Minister of Andhra Pradesh  legendary actor, N. T. Rama Rao. He entered the film industry as a child artist at the age of 14 with the film Tatamma Kala. In the mid-1980s, he graduated to acting in the lead role and soon became one of the sought after actors in Telugu cinema. In his career spanning 40 years, he has acted in over hundred films in a variety of roles. Known for his dancing skills, Balakrishna has received two state Nandi Awards for best acting.

He was the guest of honour at the 43rd International Film Festival of India. He is actively involved in politics and is a member of the Telugu Desam Party (TDP) founded by his father. In 2014 and 2019 he was elected incumbent M. L. A. from Hindupur for the Andhra Pradesh Legislative Assembly. He is also the chairman of the trust board for The Basavatarakam Indo American Cancer Hospital and Research Institute based in Hyderabad, India.

Film

Cameo appearances

Television

See also
 List of Indian film actors
 Telugu cinema

Notes

References

Indian filmographies
Male actor filmographies